Saqlain Haider (born 10 August 1987) is a Pakistani-born cricketer who played for the United Arab Emirates national cricket team. He made his One Day International debut for the United Arab Emirates against Afghanistan on 2 December 2014. He made his Twenty20 International debut for the United Arab Emirates against Scotland on 4 February 2016.

In April 2017, he scored his maiden first-class century in round five of the 2015–17 ICC Intercontinental Cup against Papua New Guinea.

References

External links
 

1987 births
Living people
Emirati cricketers
United Arab Emirates One Day International cricketers
United Arab Emirates Twenty20 International cricketers
Cricketers from Rawalpindi
Cricketers at the 2015 Cricket World Cup
Pakistani emigrants to the United Arab Emirates
Pakistani expatriate sportspeople in the United Arab Emirates
Wicket-keepers